Glencoe Township is a township in Butler County, Kansas, USA.  As of the 2000 census, its population was 239.

History
Glencoe Township was created in 1877.

Geography
According to the USGS, it contains three cemeteries: Beaumont, Butts and Harmony.

Transportation
Glencoe Township contains one airport or landing strip, Beaumont Hotel Airport.

Further reading

References

 USGS Geographic Names Information System (GNIS)

External links
 City-Data.com

Townships in Butler County, Kansas
Townships in Kansas